Tall Dark Hill was the final album by indie rock band Wolfie. It was released in 2001 by March Records.

Track listing
 "What I Want From the World"
 "A Checkered Begonia"
 "Waiting For the Night to End"
 "Everybody Knows How to Cry"
 "Gwendolyn"
 "Crab and the Beach"
 "Living Island Is Real"
 "Slip of a Shingle"
 "You Are a Woman"
 "Happy State of Mr. Bubbins"

References

2001 albums
Wolfie albums